is a railway station on the East Japan Railway Company (JR East) Tsugaru Line located in the town of Sotogahama, Aomori Prefecture, Japan.

Lines

Station layout
Ōdai Station has one ground-level side platform serving a single bidirectional track. The station is unattended.

History
Ōdai Station was opened on October 21, 1958 as a station on the Japanese National Railways (JNR). With the privatization of the JNR on April 1, 1987, it came under the operational control of JR East.

Surrounding area
Aomori Prefectural Route 12

See also
 List of Railway Stations in Japan

External links

 

Stations of East Japan Railway Company
Railway stations in Japan opened in 1958
Railway stations in Aomori Prefecture
Tsugaru Line
Sotogahama, Aomori